The  is an electric multiple unit (EMU) train type operated on the Saitama Rapid Railway Line in Saitama Prefecture, Japan, by the third-sector railway operating company Saitama Railway Corporation since March 2001.

Operations
The trains are used on Saitama Rapid Railway Line services, with through-running to and from the Tokyo Metro Namboku Line and Tokyu Meguro Line.

Formations
As of 1 April 2014, the fleet consists of 10 six-car sets, each formed of three motored ("M") cars and three non-powered trailer ("T") cars, as shown below, with car 1 at the northern (Urawa-Misono) end.

 Car 2 has a lozenge-type pantograph, and car 4 has two.
 Cars 2 and 5 each have a wheelchair space.
 Car 4 is designated as a mildy air-conditioned car.

Interior
Passenger accommodation consists of longitudinal bench seating with priority seats in each car.

History
The 2000 series trains entered service on 28 March 2001, coinciding with the opening of the Saitama Rapid Railway Line.

References

Electric multiple units of Japan
Train-related introductions in 2001
Kawasaki multiple units
Kinki Sharyo multiple units
1500 V DC multiple units of Japan